The Monroe Station was a historic gas station, restaurant and bar in Ochopee, Florida. It was located at the junction of Tamiami Trail and Loop Road. On May 11, 2000, it was added to the U.S. National Register of Historic Places. As of July 29, 2007, it was boarded up and abandoned.

Monroe Station burned to the ground April 9, 2016. It was delisted from the National Register on May 15, 2019.

References and external links

External links
Monroe Station at Florida's Office of Cultural and Historical Programs

National Register of Historic Places in Big Cypress National Preserve
Historic American Buildings Survey in Florida
Buildings and structures demolished in 2016
Former National Register of Historic Places in Florida
2016 disestablishments in Florida